The Mehdiabad mine is one of the largest lead and zinc mines in Iran. The mine is located in central Iran in Yazd Province. The mine has reserves amounting to 394 million tonnes of ore grading 4.2% zinc thus resulting 16.5 million tonnes of zinc.

See also 
Mining in Iran

References 

Lead and zinc mines in Iran